Omar "RoxRite" Delgado Macias (born April 6, 1982) is a competitive b-boy from Windsor, California. As of March 2018, he has won 100 titles including the UK B-Boy Championships (2005), R16 (2009), Red Bull BC One (2011) and Freestyle Session (2009, 2013, and 2014).

RoxRite was born in Guadalajara, Mexico and raised in Windsor, California. His family moved to the United States when he was six years old, but he wasn't introduced to breaking until he was 12. Although he was born in Mexico, RoxRite represents the U.S. in competition because the U.S. is where he was raised and where he learned breaking. He won his first international b-boy title in France in 2003.

His style of b-boying led to the name 'Roxrite,' a term referring to how he always rocked right (i.e. danced the right way). Roxrite is one of three dancers from the US to have claimed the Red Bull BC One title.

RoxRite appeared in a documentary about breaking called Turn It Loose (2010) and in two seasons of the Red Bull-produced online reality series Break'n Reality (2012 and 2014). In 2013, he was on the selection committee for the B-Boy Scholarship Fund sponsored by TheBBoySpot.com. In 2015, he co-directed an online series with b-boy Ali "Lilou" Ramdani called Crew Code. He is a member of four b-boy crews: Renegades, Squadron, Break Disciples, and Red Bull BC One All-Stars.

Titles
Source:

Footnotes

References

External links

1982 births
Breakdancers
Living people
Mexican male dancers
People from Guadalajara, Jalisco
21st-century Mexican dancers
21st-century American dancers